Argyrotype is an iron-based silver printing process that produces brown images on plain paper. It is an alternative process derived from the argentotype, kallitype, and Van Dyke processes of the 19th century, but has greater simplicity, improved image stability, and longer sensitizer shelf-life. It was developed by Mike Ware.

While this process may not have the permanence of other processes such as platinum or palladium printing, it is much less expensive and more user friendly. The core resource used is silver sulphamate (NH2SO3Ag) which can be prepared on site from sulphamic acid. The sensitizer used is very slow, so printing must be by contact with a large format negative, using an ultraviolet lamp or sunlight.

As with most alternative processes there is room for manipulating the process to achieve different effects, and since the image is produced on plain paper many drawing or print making processes can be combined with the original image.

References

External links
The Argyrotype Process by Mike Ware
Formula overview for Vandyke, Kallitype and Argyrotype by Wynn White

Printmaking